Fábio Alves Félix (born 10 January 1980), commonly known as Fabinho, is a Brazilian football manager and former player who played as a defensive midfielder. He's currently in charge of São Caetano.

Career 
He joined Toulouse in 2006 and was loaned at Corinthians. He played a total of 39 matches for Toulouse, scoring 6 goals. On 3 June 2009 Cruzeiro have signed the midfielder from French club Toulouse.

Personal life 
Born in São Bernardo do Campo, he is one of the rare footballers (other examples include former football player Álvaro Magalhães) to have polydactylism, which means he has an extra finger on each hand.

Club statistics

References

External links

1980 births
Living people
Brazilian footballers
Brazilian expatriate footballers
Toulouse FC players
Ligue 1 players
Expatriate footballers in France
Sport Club Corinthians Paulista players
Santos FC players
Cruzeiro Esporte Clube players
Esporte Clube Bahia players
Associação Desportiva São Caetano players
Cerezo Osaka players
Yokohama FC players
Campeonato Brasileiro Série A players
Campeonato Brasileiro Série B players
J1 League players
J2 League players
Expatriate footballers in Japan
Association football midfielders
Associação Desportiva São Caetano managers
People from São Bernardo do Campo
Footballers from São Paulo (state)
Associação Atlética Internacional (Limeira) managers